The 2013–14 season was Tottenham Hotspur's 22nd season in the Premier League and 36th successive season in the top division of the English football league system.

The campaign featured Tottenham's 12th appearance in the UEFA Europa League (formerly the UEFA Cup), entering the Play-off round due to finishing fifth in the 2012–13 Premier League season.

Squad

First team squad

Transfers

In

Total spending:  £109,000,000

Out

Total income:  £115,700,000+

Loan out

Spending
Summer:  £109,000,000

Winter:  £0

Total:  £109,000,000

Income
Summer:  £109,200,000

Winter:  £6,500,000+

Total:  £115,700,000+

Expenditure
Summer:  £200,000

Winter:  £6,500,000+

Total:  £6,700,000+

Friendlies

Pre-season

Mid-season Spurs XI friendlies

Post-season

In April, the club announced that the current Spurs XI would stage a testimonial in honour of one-club man Ledley King against a team named the 'Ledley Guest XI'. Former players who turned out for the Ledley Guest XI included Teddy Sheringham, Darren Anderton, Dimitar Berbatov, David Ginola, Peter Crouch, Edgar Davids; the team was captained by King himself, who opened the scoring with a penalty.

Competitions

Overall

Premier League

League table

Results summary

Results by matchday

Matches

FA Cup

League Cup

UEFA Europa League

Play-off round

Group stage

Knockout phase

Round of 32

Round of 16

Statistics

Appearances

Top scorers
The list is sorted by squad number when total goals are equal.

Clean sheets
The list is sorted by squad number when total clean sheets are equal.

References

Tottenham Hotspur F.C. seasons
Tottenham Hotspur
Tottenham